Mark Alan Bickley (born 4 August 1969) is a former Australian rules footballer who played for the Adelaide Football Club in the Australian Football League (AFL). Bickley was a player for the Crows from 1991 until 2003, captaining the team to both the 1997 and 1998 AFL premierships. He was a media commentator, most notably with Channel 9 in Adelaide as their sports presenter. In 2011 he had a brief coaching career as caretaker coach of the Crows after the retirement of Neil Craig.

Playing career

Adelaide Crows
Recruited from South Australian National Football League (SANFL) club South Adelaide, Bickley made his AFL debut in 1991 against  at Windy Hill, as an inaugural member of the Adelaide Crows squad. In 1997 he was appointed captain of the Adelaide Football Club, and captained the 1997 and 1998 premiership sides.

After retiring from the AFL in 2003, he began presenting the weekend sports report on Nine News Adelaide alongside Georgina McGuinness, and in 2004 he became a panellist on the Nine Network's Sunday Footy Show.

Coaching career
In 2009, Bickley became an assistant coach at the Crows, thus ending his career on the Sunday Footy Show and Nine News.

Adelaide Crows
In the 2011 season, Bickley took over as caretaker senior coach at Adelaide after Neil Craig stepped down at the end of Round 18. His reign as Adelaide coach began with a convincing win over Port Adelaide in Showdown XXXI. It was just their fifth win of the season, and their second since the end of April. This was followed up with a narrow 5-point victory over the Brisbane Lions at the Gabba in Round 20, for the Crows' first win outside of Adelaide this season. At the end of the 2011 season, Bickley was not retained as Adelaide Football Club senior coach with the appointment of Brenton Sanderson as the senior coach.

In November 2014, Mark Bickley joined the 5AA talk radio station as a co-host of the top rating weeknight sports show.

Bickley stepped away from full-time radio in 2021, and currently coaches the Immanuel College, Adelaide First XVIII football side.

Statistics

|-
|- style="background-color: #EAEAEA"
! scope="row" style="text-align:center" | 1991
|style="text-align:center;"|
| 26 || 18 || 3 || 7 || 168 || 142 || 310 || 47 || 19 || 0.2 || 0.4 || 9.3 || 7.9 || 17.2 || 2.6 || 1.1
|-
! scope="row" style="text-align:center" | 1992
|style="text-align:center;"|
| 26 || 22 || 3 || 1 || 265 || 247 || 512 || 73 || 37 || 0.1 || 0.0 || 12.0 || 11.2 || 23.3 || 3.3 || 1.7
|- style="background-color: #EAEAEA"
! scope="row" style="text-align:center" | 1993
|style="text-align:center;"|
| 26 || 23 || 13 || 9 || 297 || 266 || 563 || 93 || 63 || 0.6 || 0.4 || 12.9 || 11.6 || 24.5 || 4.0 || 2.7
|-
! scope="row" style="text-align:center" | 1994
|style="text-align:center;"|
| 26 || 11 || 2 || 4 || 150 || 100 || 250 || 34 || 28 || 0.2 || 0.4 || 13.6 || 9.1 || 22.7 || 3.1 || 2.5
|- style="background-color: #EAEAEA"
! scope="row" style="text-align:center" | 1995
|style="text-align:center;"|
| 26 || 22 || 2 || 4 || 217 || 178 || 395 || 52 || 42 || 0.1 || 0.2 || 9.9 || 8.1 || 18.0 || 2.4 || 1.9
|-
! scope="row" style="text-align:center" | 1996
|style="text-align:center;"|
| 26 || 22 || 8 || 6 || 263 || 208 || 471 || 76 || 61 || 0.4 || 0.3 || 12.0 || 9.5 || 21.4 || 3.5 || 2.8
|- style="background-color: #EAEAEA"
! scope="row" style="text-align:center" | 1997
|style="text-align:center;"|
| 26 || 26 || 12 || 21 || 351 || 197 || 548 || 84 || 80 || 0.5 || 0.8 || 13.5 || 7.6 || 21.1 || 3.2 || 3.1
|-
! scope="row" style="text-align:center" | 1998
|style="text-align:center;"|
| 26 || 23 || 10 || 11 || 270 || 160 || 430 || 74 || 64 || 0.4 || 0.5 || 11.7 || 7.0 || 18.7 || 3.2 || 2.8
|- style="background-color: #EAEAEA"
! scope="row" style="text-align:center" | 1999
|style="text-align:center;"|
| 26 || 18 || 7 || 4 || 174 || 152 || 326 || 54 || 25 || 0.4 || 0.2 || 9.7 || 8.4 || 18.1 || 3.0 || 1.4
|-
! scope="row" style="text-align:center" | 2000
|style="text-align:center;"|
| 26 || 20 || 5 || 9 || 240 || 139 || 379 || 61 || 50 || 0.3 || 0.5 || 12.0 || 7.0 || 19.0 || 3.1 || 2.5
|- style="background-color: #EAEAEA"
! scope="row" style="text-align:center" | 2001
|style="text-align:center;"|
| 26 || 23 || 2 || 5 || 285 || 149 || 434 || 74 || 62 || 0.1 || 0.2 || 12.4 || 6.5 || 18.9 || 3.2 || 2.7
|-
! scope="row" style="text-align:center" | 2002
|style="text-align:center;"|
| 26 || 20 || 5 || 5 || 242 || 185 || 427 || 85 || 54 || 0.3 || 0.3 || 12.1 || 9.3 || 21.4 || 4.3 || 2.7
|- style="background-color: #EAEAEA"
! scope="row" style="text-align:center" | 2003
|style="text-align:center;"|
| 26 || 24 || 5 || 4 || 241 || 191 || 432 || 79 || 73 || 0.2 || 0.2 || 10.0 || 8.0 || 18.0 || 3.3 || 3.0
|- class="sortbottom"
! colspan=3| Career
! 272
! 77
! 90
! 3163
! 2314
! 5477
! 886
! 658
! 0.3
! 0.3
! 11.6
! 8.5
! 20.1
! 3.3
! 2.4
|}

Head coaching record

Explanatory notes

References

External links

Adelaide Football Club players
Adelaide Football Club Premiership players
People from Port Pirie
Australian rules footballers from South Australia
South Adelaide Football Club players
South Australian State of Origin players
Australian Football Hall of Fame inductees
Adelaide Football Club coaches
South Australian Football Hall of Fame inductees
1969 births
Living people
Australia international rules football team players
Two-time VFL/AFL Premiership players